David Y. Oh is an American spacecraft systems engineer and expert in electric propulsion. Oh currently works at the Jet Propulsion Laboratory (JPL) as the NASA Psyche mission Project Systems Engineering Manager.  Prior to his role on Psyche, he was the cross-cutting phase lead and lead flight director for the NASA Mars Science Laboratory mission (Curiosity Mars rover) and was recognized in popular media for living on Mars time with his family during the month following the landing of the Curiosity rover.

Early life and education

David Oh was raised in Birmingham, Alabama and graduated from Indian Springs School in 1987.

He attended the Massachusetts Institute of Technology where he earned Bachelors of Science degrees in Aeronautics and Astronautics (1991) and in Humanities, Music (1991).  He went on to earn both a Master's degree (1993) and a Doctor of Science degree (1997) in Aeronautics and Astronautics from MIT.  For his doctoral thesis, Dr. Oh developed the first Particle-In-Cell Direct Simulation Monte-Carlo (PIC-DSMC) model to simulate the plasma plume ejected by a Hall-effect thruster.

He married his wife, Bryn, in 1995. They have three children: Braden, Ashlyn, and Devyn.

Career

From 1996 to 2003 Oh worked for Space Systems/Loral (SS/L). He served as an electrical systems engineer on commercial communications satellite programs including IPSTAR, Europe*star, and Multi-Media Asia. While at SS/L, Oh led the systems engineering efforts for both the SPT-100 and SPT-140 Hall effect thrusters, pioneering the adoption of Hall thrusters in commercial satellites by being the first to show analytically that Hall thrusters offer optimum specific impulse for chemical-electric orbit raising to geostationary orbit.

In 2003, Oh moved to NASA’s Jet Propulsion Laboratory. In JPL’s Deep Space Mission Architectures Group he was the lead systems engineer for the GRAIL step 1 Discovery proposal and the ST9 Aerocapture Phase A study for the New Millennium Program.  GRAIL went on to become a flight project in NASA’s Discovery Program.

In 2006, Oh joined the Mars Science Laboratory (Curiosity Rover) team. As the cross-cutting comain lead he led two multidisciplinary teams through the design, testing, and delivery of the core avionics, thermal, and communications systems flying on MSL.

In 2011, Oh became MSL’s Lead Flight Director. When Curiosity landed in August 2012, Dr. Oh’s wife and three school-aged children joined him when he lived on Mars time for the month following Curiosity’s landing. Their adventures garnered worldwide media attention.

After Curiosity’s early surface operations, Oh moved back into mission formulation as the Planetary Missions Portfolio Systems Engineer where he managed new mission development for JPL’s Discovery and New Frontiers portfolios. Most notably, he served as Capture Lead for the mission Psyche: Journey to a Metal World, successfully leading a JPL proposal team from initial concept through NASA’s Discovery program step 1. During step 2 he served the dual role of Capture Lead and Project Systems Engineer, leading his team to winning step 2 and moving Psyche from a proposed project to a flight project.

Since 2017, Oh has served as the Project Systems Engineering Manager for Psyche, leading the systems engineering team and acting as Engineering Technical Authority.  Psyche is currently a $900M Discovery Class deep space science exploration mission and will be the first space mission to use Hall-effect thrusters beyond lunar orbit, using two SPT-140 thrusters to explore the asteroid belt.

Awards
In addition to receiving a variety of NASA and JPL awards, Oh received a NASA Exceptional Achievement Medal in 2013 for the design, testing, and delivery of the core flight system functionality as the Cross-Cutting Domain Lead for MSL, and the Korean Economic Institute’s Recognition for Outstanding Contributions to the United States and Korean American community in science and technology in 2017.

Patents
US 6,332,590:  Photoemission based spacecraft charging sensor
US 6,478,257:  Phase change material thermal control for electric propulsion
US 6,543,723:  Electric orbit raising with variable thrust
US 6,581,880:  Energy managed electric propulsion methods & systems for stationkeeping satellites
US 10,954,005 B1: Power train for deep space solar electric propulsion

See also
 Bobak Ferdowsi
 Daniel E. Hastings
 Lindy Elkins-Tanton

References

Year of birth missing (living people)
Living people
Space scientists
Aeronautical engineers
NASA people
Massachusetts Institute of Technology alumni
People from Birmingham, Alabama